The 1939 World Table Tennis Championships – Corbillon Cup (women's team) was the sixth edition of the women's team championship. 

Germany won the gold medal in a drastically reduced competition with only five teams taking part.

Final table

See also
 List of World Table Tennis Championships medalists

References

-
1939 in women's table tennis